Zymogen granule protein 16 homolog B is a protein that in humans is encoded by the ZG16B gene.

References

Further reading